José Ignacio Prendes Prendes (born 22 February 1965 in Gijón) is a Spanish politician and member of Congress of the Deputies with the Citizens-Party of the Citizenry party (C's). Since 21 May 2019, he has been the Fourth Vice President of the Congress of Deputies.

He studied law at Oviedo University. In 1998, he obtained a master's degree in law and taxation in Madrid, after which he started his own practice in Gijón, focussing on real estate law.

For a time he was a member of the Citizens-Party of the Citizenry political party. Later, he joined Plataforma Pro which was created to offer an alternative to the established parties. Out of Plataforma Pro emerged the new UPyD party, of which he has been a member since its foundation. He is currently a member of the Direction Council of the party, as coordinator of Institutional Action. In the 2012 Asturian election he headed the UPyD candidate list for the central Asturias constituency. His party received 3.75% of the vote in Asturias as a whole and 4.3% of the vote in his constituency.

On 2015, he came back to C's after being expelled from UPyD. He was elected firstly as member of the General Junta of the Principality of Asturias in the Regional election and later as Deputy in the General election.

References

1965 births
Politicians from Asturias
Citizens (Spanish political party) politicians
Living people
Members of the 11th Congress of Deputies (Spain)
Members of the 12th Congress of Deputies (Spain)
People from Gijón
Union, Progress and Democracy politicians
University of Oviedo alumni
Members of the 13th Congress of Deputies (Spain)